Kevin Moore (born 6 February 1954) is a former Australian rules footballer who played for Melbourne in the Victorian Football League (VFL).

Notes

External links 

		
		
		

1954 births
Australian rules footballers from Victoria (Australia)
Melbourne Football Club players
Living people